The House of Commons of Great Britain was the lower house of the Parliament of Great Britain between 1707 and 1801. In 1707, as a result of the Acts of Union of that year, it replaced the House of Commons of England and the third estate of the Parliament of Scotland, as one of the most significant changes brought about by the Union of the kingdoms of England and Scotland into the Kingdom of Great Britain.

In the course of the 18th century, the office of Prime Minister developed. The notion that a government remains in power only as long as it retains the support of Parliament also evolved, leading to the first ever motion of no confidence, when Lord North's government failed to end the American Revolution. The modern notion that only the support of the House of Commons is necessary for a government to survive, however, was of later development. Similarly, the custom that the Prime Minister is always a Member of the Lower House, rather than the Upper one, did not evolve until the twentieth century.

The business of the house was controlled by an elected Speaker. The Speaker's official role was to moderate debate, make rulings on procedure, announce the results of votes, and the like. The Speaker decided who may speak and had the powers to discipline members who break the procedures of the house. The Speaker often also represented the body in person, as the voice of the body in ceremonial and some other situations. The title was first recorded in 1377 to describe the role of Thomas de Hungerford in the Parliament of England. By convention, Speakers are normally addressed in Parliament as Mister Speaker, if a man, or Madam Speaker, if a woman.

In 1801, the House was enlarged to become the House of Commons of the United Kingdom, as a result of the Act of Union of 1800 which combined Great Britain and the Kingdom of Ireland into the United Kingdom of Great Britain and Ireland.

Creation
The members of the last House of Commons of England had been elected between 7 May and 6 June 1705, and from 1707 they all continued to sit as members of the new House of Commons. The last general election in Scotland had been held in the autumn of 1702, and from 1707 only forty-five of the members of the Parliament of Scotland joined the new house. In Scotland there was also no new election from the burghs, and the places available were filled by co-option from the last Parliament.

Parliamentary constituencies
The constituencies which elected members in England and Wales remained unchanged throughout the existence of the Parliament of Great Britain.

Sources:
Chris Cook & John Stevenson, British Historical Facts 1760-1830 (The Macmillan Press, 1980)
Colin Rallings & Michael Thrasher, British Electoral Facts 1832-1999 (Ashgate Publishing Ltd, 2000)

See also
Elections in Great Britain
Unreformed House of Commons
List of parliaments of Great Britain
First Parliament of Great Britain
2nd Parliament of Great Britain
List of members of the House of Commons at Westminster 1705–1708
List of speakers of the British House of Commons

References

Further reading 
 "Parliamentary Register: Proceedings of the House of Commons 1775"

External links
18th Century Parliamentary Papers

Parliament of Great Britain
Westminster system
Defunct lower houses
1707 establishments in Great Britain
1800 disestablishments in Great Britain
House of Commons of the United Kingdom